Acacia burkittii is a species of wattle endemic to Western Australia, South Australia and western New South Wales, where it is found in arid zones, and is a perennial shrub in the family Fabaceae.  Common names for it include Burkitt's wattle, fine leaf jam, gunderbluey, pin bush and sandhill wattle. It has also been introduced into India. Previously this species was referred to as Acacia acuminata subsp. burkittii, but is now considered to be a separate species. Grows in mallee, eucalypt and mulga woodland or shrubland, often on sandhills.

Description
Erect or spreading shrub 1–4 m high or sometimes taller; bark finely fissured, dark brown; branchlets terete, glabrous.

Phyllodes straight or curved, terete or subterete, 5–16 cm long, 0.5–1.3 mm wide, obscurely multistriate, usually finely hairy along margins especially towards curved, acute apex; glands absent or 1 inconspicuous gland at base; pulvinus 2–3 mm long.

Inflorescences 2 or 3 in axil of phyllodes; heads ± ovoid or cylindrical, 0.5–1.5 cm long, bright yellow, usually sessile or with peduncles 1–3 mm long. Flowers mostly 4-merous; calyx dissected by 1/2 or more, the lobes usually narrow, with rounded obtuse apices (i.e. ± spathulate).

Pods slightly curved, moniliform, 5–12 cm long, 5–7 mm wide, papery, glabrous; seeds longitudinal; funicle expanded towards seed.

Flowers from July to October.

Taxonomy 
The description (by Ferdinand von Mueller) was published in George Bentham's Flora Australiensis in 1864 from a specimen, MEL 2078154, found near Lake Gilles in South Australia, by Burkitt.

Alkaloids
DMT in bark (0.2-1.2%), 0.1% alkaloids from leaves (mostly NMT); 1.5% alkaloids from leaves and stems, mostly tryptamine

References

burkittii
Plants described in 1864
Trees of Australia
Fabales of Australia
Acacias of Western Australia
Taxa named by Ferdinand von Mueller